Bibek Debroy is an Indian economist, serving as the chairman of the Economic Advisory Council to the Prime Minister of India. Debroy has made significant contributions to game theory, economic theory, income and social inequalities, poverty, law reforms, railway reforms and Indology among others. He is also an anchor for the fortnightly show Itihasa on Sansad TV.

From its inception in January 2015, till June 2019, Mr. Debroy was a member of the NITI Aayog, the think tank of the Indian Government. He was awarded the Padma Shri (the fourth-highest civilian honour in India) in 2015. In 2016, he was awarded the Lifetime Achievement Award by US-India Business Summit.

Early life and education
Debroy was born in Shillong, now in Meghalaya, on 25 January 1955. His grandparents had migrated from Sylhet, now in Bangladesh; his paternal grandfather and his father migrating as late as 1948. His father went on to join the Indian Audit and Accounts Service.

Bibek Debroy started his school education at Narendrapur Ramakrishna Mission School. After that he studied at Kolkata Presidency College and Delhi School of Economics. Later on, Debroy went to the University of Cambridge on a Trinity College scholarship, where he met his then supervisor, Frank Hahn, a noted British economist. Debroy, under the tutelage of Hahn, worked on integrating information into a general equilibrium framework. A considerable amount of work on integrating information into a general equilibrium framework took place during this period. Though his initial intention was to complete a PhD, owing to no substantial results, Debroy settled for the lower degree of MSc and returned to work in India.

Career
His past positions include the Director of the Rajiv Gandhi Institute for Contemporary Studies, Consultant to the Department of Economic Affairs of Finance Ministry (Government of India), Secretary-General of PhD Chamber of Commerce and Industry and Director of the project LARGE (Legal Adjustments and Reforms for Globalising the Economy), set up by the Finance Ministry and UNDP for examining legal reforms in India.  Between December 2006 and July 2007, he was the rapporteur for implementation in the Commission on Legal Empowerment of the Poor. Debroy has authored several books, papers and popular articles, has been the Consulting Editor of Indian financial and other newspapers. He has been a member of the National Manufacturing Competitive Council from November 2004 to December 2009.  He was the Chairman of a Committee set up by the Chief Minister of Jharkhand to recommend a development plan for the State. He has been a Member of the Chief Minister's Economic Advisory Council in Rajasthan.

From 2014 to 2015, he was the Chairman of the High Powered Committee set up by the Ministry of Railways to restructure Indian Railways. In the past, Debroy has taught at Presidency College, Calcutta, Gokhale Institute of Politics and Economics, the Indian Institute of Foreign Trade and the National Council of Applied Economic Research.

On 5 January 2015, he was appointed as permanent member of NITI Aayog (or National Institution for Transforming India Aayog), which is the replacement of Planning Commission and will act as a think-tank to the government of India. He served as a Member of Niti Aayog till June 2019.  In September 2017, he was appointed Chairman of the Economic Advisory Council to the Prime Minister.
In September 2018, he was appointed the President of the Indian Statistical Institute.

Itihasa: Sansad TV Series 
Debroy anchors Itihasa, a show telecasted on Sansad TV, the official channel of Parliament of India. The series is a journey to discover what is "Bharata", what it means to be "Bhartiya" and what it means in terms of India's Sanatana Sanskriti.

Translations 
Debroy has translated the unabridged version of the Mahabharata into English, in a series of 10 volumes. He has also translated the Bhagavad Gita, the Harivamsa, the Vedas and Valmiki's Ramayana (in three volumes). He has translated the Bhagavata Purana (in three volumes), the Markandeya Purana (one volume), the Brahma Purana (two volumes) and the Vishnu Purana (one volume).  Along with Manmatha Nath Dutt, he is only the second person to have translated both the Mahabharata and the Ramayana, in unabridged form, into English.

Reception
Willis Goth Regier, director of the University of Illinois Press, found Debroy's translation of Ramayana to be poor and lacking in every aspect, if compared to that of Robert P. Goldman.

In contrast, reception by non-experts in popular press has been favorable. Business Standard, reviewing his translation of Ramayana, admired of Debroy's lucidity and addition of explanatory footnotes. Arshia Sattar, reviewing the same work for The Indian Express, applauded his remarkable feat of translating the two major Sanskrit epics and praised his introduction to the text as well as literal translation; notwithstanding the relatively poor scholarly apparatus vis-à-vis Goldman, Debroy's was held to be more compact and accessible. Hindustan Times, reviewing the translation of Mahabharata, commended his academic-like rigor and passion; it spoke favorably of Debroy's choice of words—modernized yet true to the Sanskrit source—, and sprinkling of mathematical details in notes.

References

Bibliography

Economics
 India: Redeeming the Economic Pledge, Academic Foundation, 2004 <https://web.archive.org/web/20110707075705/http://www.academicfoundation.com/n_detail/debroy.asp>.
 Transforming West Bengal, Changing the Agenda for an Agenda for Change, jointly with Laveesh Bhandari, February 2009 <https://web.archive.org/web/20101218180830/http://indicus.net/media/index.php/2009/1324-transforming-west-bengal-changing-the-agenda-for-an-agenda-for-change>.
 India Labour Report 2008 – The Right to Rise: Making India's Labour Markets Inclusive," jointly with Laveeesh Bhandari, TeamLease Services, 2009 <https://web.archive.org/web/20101221105636/http://teamlease.com/images/reports/TeamLease_LabourReport2008.pdf>.
 India Labour Report 2009 – The Geographic Mismatch & A Ranking of Indian States by their Labour Ecosystem, jointly with Laveesh Bhandari, TeamLease Services, 2010 <https://web.archive.org/web/20101221103929/http://teamlease.com/images/reports/TeamLease_LabourReport2009.pdf>.
 Economic Freedom of the States of India 2011, Academic Foundation, 2011, jointly with Swaminathan Aiyar and Laveesh Bhandari <http://www.cato.org/economic-freedom-india/>.
 The India Mosaic – Searching for an Identity, Academic Foundation and Rajiv Gandhi Institute for Contemporary Studies, Delhi, 2004, jointly edited with D. Shyam Babu <https://web.archive.org/web/20110707075717/http://www.academicfoundation.com/n_detail/imosaic.asp>.
 Agenda for Improving Governance, Academic Foundation and Rajiv Gandhi Institute for Contemporary Studies, Delhi 2004 <https://web.archive.org/web/20110707075729/http://www.academicfoundation.com/n_detail/agenda.asp>.
 Integrating the Rural Poor into Markets, India Development Foundation and International Development Enterprises, Academic Foundation, Delhi 2004 <https://web.archive.org/web/20110707075844/http://www.academicfoundation.com/n_detail/Rpoor.asp>.
 Small-Scale Industry in India, Large Scale Exit Problems, jointly edited with Laveesh Bhandari, Academic Foundation, Friedrich Naumann Stiftung and Rajiv Gandhi Institute for Contemporary Studies, 2004 <https://web.archive.org/web/20110707075859/http://www.academicfoundation.com/n_detail/SSI-LSEP.asp>.
 Energizing Rural Development through Panchayats, jointly edited with P.D. Kaushik, Academic Foundation and Rajiv Gandhi Institute for Contemporary Studies, 2004.
 Reforming the Labour Market, jointly edited with P.D. Kaushik, Academic Foundation and Rajiv Gandhi Institute for Contemporary Studies, 2004 <https://web.archive.org/web/20110707075909/http://www.academicfoundation.com/n_detail/Refo_L.asp>.
 Uses and Misuses of Anti-Dumping Provisions in World Trade, A Cross-Country Perspective, jointly edited with Debashis Chakraborty, Academic Foundation and Rajiv Gandhi Institute for Contemporary Studies, 2006 <https://web.archive.org/web/20110707075921/http://www.academicfoundation.com/n_detail/antidump.asp>.
 The Trade Game, Negotiation Trends at WTO and Concerns of Developing Countries, jointly edited with Debashis Chakraborty, Academic Foundation and Rajiv Gandhi Institute for Contemporary Studies, 2006 <http://www.academicfoundation.com/n_detail/tradeGame.asp>.
 Judicial Reforms in India, Issues and Aspects, Rajiv Gandhi Institute for Contemporary Studies and Academic Foundation, 2007, jointly edited with Arnab Kumar Hazra <https://web.archive.org/web/20110707075943/http://www.academicfoundation.com/n_detail/jreforms.asp>.
 Anti-Dumping, Global Abuse of a Trade Policy Instrument, jointly edited with Debashis Chakraborty, Liberty Institute and Academic Foundation, 2007 <https://web.archive.org/web/20110707080007/http://www.academicfoundation.com/n_detail/antiD-GA.asp>.
 India Health Report 2010, edited with Ajay Mahal and Laveesh Bhandari, Indicus Analytics and Business Standard Books, 2010 <http://www.business-standard.com/books/books.php?lmnu=m1&sub=11&val=11>.
 Corruption in India – The DNA and the RNA, jointly with Laveesh Bhandari, Konark Publishers, 2011, 
 Gujarat: Governance for Growth and Development, Academic Foundation, 2012. https://books.google.com/books?id=4iCuNAEACAAJ&dq=gujarat+growth+for+governance+and+development&hl=en&sa=X&ei=_Q1cUemFBeeQigfzv4DIBQ&sqi=2&ved=0CC8Q6AEwAA
 Economic Freedom of the States of India, 2012, jointly with Laveesh Bhandari, Swaminathan S. Anklesaria Aiyar and Ashok Gulati, Academic Foundation, 2013.
 Getting India Back on Track: An Action Agenda for Reform, jointly with Ashley Tellis and Reece Trevor, Carnegie Endowment, http://carnegieendowment.org/2014/06/09/getting-india-back-on-track-action-agenda-for-reform/hdr3
 Meghalaya, On the Paths to Prosperity, 2014, Aakhya Media Services, https://web.archive.org/web/20150710215729/http://www.aakhyamedia.com/index.php/product/meghalaya/
 Footprints ... The Story of Chhattisgarh, 2016, Aakhya Media Services, 
 India 2047, Voices of the Young, edited, 2017, Academic Foundation, http://academicfoundation.org/index.php?route=product/product&product_id=821
Indian Railways, The Weaving of a National Tapestry, jointly with Sanjay Chadha and Vidya Krishnamurthi, Portfolio/Penguin, 2017, https://web.archive.org/web/20170129164338/http://penguin.co.in/book/uncategorized/indian-railways/
 India @ 70, Modi @ 3.5, Capturing India's transformation under Narendra Modi, jointly edited with Ashok Malik, Wisdom Tree, 2017, 
 Ideas for India, Faster, Higher, Stronger, Wisdom Tree, 2017, 
 On the Trail of the Black, Tracking Corruption, jointly edited with Kishore Arun Desai, Rupa Publications, 2017, http://rupapublications.co.in/books/on-the-trail-of-the-black-tracking-corruption/
 Making of New India, Transformation Under Modi Government, jointly edited with Anirban Ganguly and Kishore Desai, Wisdom Tree, 2019.
 The Railway Chronicles, Synergy Books India, 2019.
 Reason and Reform, How Policy Reforms have Shaped India, jointly with Diwakar Jhurani, Academic Foundation, New Delhi, 2021, 
 MODI 2.0: A Resolve To Secure India, jointly edited with Ranjit Pachnanda, Anirban Ganguly & Uttam Kumar Sinha, Pentagon Press, New Delhi, 2021, (http://www.pentagonpress.in/book_details.aspx?this=15121

Indology and others
 Some Aspects of the Ramayana and the Mahabharata, 1990, South Asia Books. .
 The Bhagavad Gita, A translation, Penguin, 2006 <http://www.penguinbooksindia.com/category/Philosophy_and_Religion/Bhagavad_Gita_9780144000685.aspx>, reprinted as The Bhagavad Gita, Penguin, 2019.
 Sarama and Her Children, The Dog in Indian Myth, Penguin, 2008 <http://www.penguinbooksindia.com/category/Non_Fiction/Sarama_and_Her_Children_9780143064701.aspx>.
 The Bhagavad Gita for You, Har-Anand, 2012.
 Ujjain – The Land of Simhastha, 2015, Aakhya Media Services, https://web.archive.org/web/20160328223203/http://www.aakhyamedia.com/index.php/shop/
 The Book of Limericks, Penguin, 2018, https://penguin.co.in/book/poetry/the-book-of-limericks/
 Manmatha Nath Dutt, Translator Extraordinaire, Rupa, 2020, http://rupapublications.co.in/books/manmatha-nath-dutt-translator-extraordinaire/
 The Bhagavad Gita for Millennials, Rupa, 2020, https://rupapublications.co.in/books/the-bhagavad-gita-for-millennials/
 Navaratri: When Devi Comes Home, jointly edited with Anuradha Goyal, Rupa, 2021, 
Unabridged translation of the Mahabharata/Ramayana/Puranas
Debroy has translated the Bhagavad Gita, the Mahabharata (10 volumes), Harivamsha, the Valmiki Ramayana (3 volumes), the Bhagavata Purana (3 volumes), the Markandeya Purana and the Brahma Purana (2 volumes). He has finished a translation of Vishnu Purana (1 volume) and Shiva Purana (3 volumes) and is now working on a translation of Brahmanda Purana.
 The Mahabharata, Vol. I. Penguin, 2010. . 536 pages. Contains most of Adi Parva.
 The Mahabharata, Vol. II. Penguin, 2010. . 528 pages. Contains the rest of Adi Parva, all of Sabha Parva, and part of the Vana Parva (ending with the story of Nala and Damayanti).
 The Mahabharata, Vol. III. Penguin, 2011. . 648 pages. Contains the rest of Vana Parva.
 The Mahabharata, Vol. IV. Penguin, 2011. . 624 pages. Contains all of Virata Parva, and most of Udyoga Parva.
 The Mahabharata, Vol. V. Penguin, 2012. . 632 pages. Contains the rest of Udyoga Parva, all of Bhishma Parva (including the Bhagavad Gita), and some of Drona Parva (including the death of Abhimanyu).
 The Mahabharata, Vol. VI. Penguin, 2012. . 560 pages. Contains the rest of Drona Parva.
 The Mahabharata, Vol. VII. Penguin, 2013. . 600 pages. Contains Karna Parva and Shalya Parva, the end of the war.
 The Mahabharata, Vol. VIII. Penguin, 2013. . 600 pages. Contains Sauptika Parva, Stri Parva and Shanti Parva.
 The Mahabharata, Vol. IX, Penguin, 2014. . 600 pages. Contains Anushasana Parva.
 The Mahabharata, Vol. X, Penguin, 2014. . 760 pages. Concludes the Anushasana Parva, and the rest of the story.
 Harivamsha, Penguin, 2016. . 441 pages.
 The Valmiki Ramayana, 2017, . 1536 pages.
 The Bhagavata Purana, Vol.1, Penguin, 2019, . 500 pages.
 The Bhagavata Purana, Vol.2, Penguin, 2019, . 500 pages.
 The Bhagavata Purana, Vol.3, Penguin, 2019, . 500 pages.
 The Markandeya Purana, Penguin, 2019, .
 The Brahma Purana, Penguin, Vol.1, 2021, .
 The Brahma Purana, Penguin, Vol.2, 2021, .
 The Vishnu Purana, Penguin, 2022, 2022, .

External links
 Biography of Bibek Debroy from the website of Economic Advisory Council to the Prime Minister
 Biography of Bibek Debroy from the website of Centre for Policy Research

1955 births
Living people
20th-century Bengalis
Ramakrishna Mission schools alumni
Presidency University, Kolkata alumni
University of Calcutta alumni
Delhi University alumni
Alumni of Trinity College, Cambridge
20th-century Indian economists
20th-century Indian educational theorists
Indian institute directors
Sanskrit–English translators
Recipients of the Padma Shri in literature & education
Indian Indologists
Indian male writers
Scientists from Delhi
21st-century Indian economists
Scholars from Delhi
Missionary linguists
People associated with Shillong